Narraga fasciolaria is a moth of the family Geometridae. It is found from the eastern part of central Europe, through central Asia and southern Russia to eastern Asia.

The wingspan is 16–21 mm. There are two generations per year. Adults of the first generation appear in May from overwintering pupa. The second generation appears in July.

The larvae feed on the leaves of Artemisia campestris. Pupation takes place in a cocoon in the soil.

Subspecies
Narraga fasciolaria fasciolaria
Narraga fasciolaria turkmenica Povolny & Moucha, 1957
Narraga fasciolaria fumipennis Prout, 1915
Narraga fasciolaria danubialis Moucha & Povolny, 1957 (Hungary and Moravia)

References

External links
 Lepiforum.de
 schmetterlinge-deutschlands.de

Moths described in 1767
Macariini
Moths of Europe
Moths of Asia
Taxa named by Johann Siegfried Hufnagel